Håkan Larsson (born 1950) is a Swedish Centre Party politician, member of the Riksdag 2002–2006.

References

1950 births
Living people
Members of the Riksdag from the Centre Party (Sweden)
Members of the Riksdag 2002–2006